Nepean is a surname. Notable people with the surname include:

Augustus Nepean (1849–1933), Middlesex county cricketer
Charles Nepean (1851–1903), Middlesex county cricketer and Oxford University footballer
Evan Nepean (1751–1822), British politician and colonial administrator
Evan Nepean (cricketer) (1865–1906), Middlesex county cricketer
Mary Edith Nepean (1876–1960), Welsh writer